James Dixon (dates of birth and death unknown) was an English first-class cricketer, active 1878, who played for Lancashire in one match against Nottinghamshire at Trent Bridge. He scored 2 runs in Lancashire's first innings before being dismissed by Fred Morley. In the second innings, Dixon was dismissed by Alfred Shaw for a duck.

References

External links
James Dixon at Cricinfo
James Dixon at CricketArchive

English cricketers
Lancashire cricketers
Year of death missing
Year of birth missing